Ruby and the Well is a family fantasy TV show on BYUtv, premiered in America on February 27, 2022. The show features a present-day teenager whose father inherits an orchard in Emerald. This leads to the two moving to Emerald where Ruby discovers a wishing well. Once she makes contact with the wishing well, Ruby becomes the new keeper of the well and must grant the wells wishes so that the town can prosper. Season one (spring 2022) and season two (fall 2022) both contain ten episodes, with season 2 having been picked up before season 1 even debuted.

Plot
Ruby is a present-day teenager who is forced to move to Emerald after her father, Daniel, inherits an orchard. While exploring the property Ruby finds a wishing well and is shown a wish that she must help fulfill.

As a newcomer to the town Ruby has a hard time knowing whom to trust. However she quickly befriends two locals: Sam and Mina. With their knowledge of the town and her ability to reach out to others Ruby just might be able to bring the town of Emerald out of the economic depression it has been stuck in for years.

Cast and characters

Main
Zoe Wiesenthal as Ruby O'Reilly. Ruby is a 14-year-old girl who moves to Emerald after her father, Daniel, inherits an orchard. She discovers a magic wishing well and becomes the keeper of the well. As keeper of the well she must help grant wishes that in turn will bless the town and bring them prosperity. 
Kristopher Turner as Daniel O'Reilly. Daniel is a single father who loves Ruby. He moves to Emerald after he inherits the orchard because he and Ruby have lost everything after the recent loss of his wife. 
Joel Oulette as Benjamin "Ben" Taggart (season 1). A resident of Emerald whose father passed away before the events of the series. He originally told the O'Reilly's his name was Brett.
Lina Sennia as Mina Amani. Mina has a great deal of loyalty and is Ruby's best friend in Emerald. However she also refuses to do anything that could bring about any harm.
Dylan Kingwell as Sam Price. Sam Price is an adopted local who has never met his parents, but he has done a great deal of research on the myths and legends of Emerald. As such he knows all about the rumors of the keeper of the well and how wishes must be granted instead of received.
Nobahar Dadui as Ava Amani. Ava owns the town's hardware store and is Mina's mother.
Paula Boudreau as Paula Price. Paula has lived her entire life in Emerald, and she wants to make a future for her adopted son Sam. She quickly befriends Daniel, but when her and Daniel have conflictual feelings on the well she must make a choice that could help or harm them all.

Recurring
 Sharron Matthews as Lucy LaFontaine. Lucy is the town busybody and the owner/operator of a florist shop
 Patrick Haye as Vince Clark. A police officer in Emerald who occasionally helps Ruby. He is also the brother of Emily Taggart and step-uncle of Ben.
 Jani Lauzon as Halona. The owner of the Orchard Grille.
 Hannan Younis as Emily Taggart. Emily is a lawyer in Emerald and Ben's stepmother.
 Steven McCarthy as Nathan Lutes. A man sent to Emerald to scope out land for a huge development.
 Kyle Breitkopf as Sebastian Lutes. Nathan's son
 Gabriel Darku as Peter "Pete" Evers. Pete is the owner and head mechanic at a local mechanic shop.
 Genevieve DeGraves as Dee Abelard. The granddaughter of Lou Abelard and employee at Abelard's Salvage.
 Michael Copeman as Liam O'Reilly. Daniel's father.

Episodes

Season 1 (2022)

Season 2 (2022)

Production
Ruby and the Well is filmed in Toronto, Ontario, Canada and is produced by Shaftesbury Films.

Release
In the United States, the show appears on BYUtv and is streamed at byutv.org and on the BYUtv App. In Canada the show airs on Family Channel and is streamed on Prime Video. In New Zealand the series airs on TVNZ and is streamed on TVNZ+.

Mythos
The power of the wishing well is based on Irish culture histories. Dating from pre-Christian times, these Irish holy wells were blessed after St. Patrick evangelized the island of Ireland. Many of these wells were later associated with saints, the most common being Patrick, Brigid of Kildare, and Ann, the mother of Mary.

These wells were not wells in which money was thrown in and wishes made. Instead they were wells where the water was believed to have healing powers and that the Saints would use to bless others and perform miracles. The visions Ruby receives from the well serve the same purpose: blessing others and allowing miracles to occur.

References

BYU TV original programming
2022 American television series debuts
2022 Canadian television series debuts
Television series about teenagers
2020s American drama television series
2020s Canadian drama television series
Family Channel (Canadian TV network) original programming